Colorado Rapids 2 is a professional soccer club based in Denver, Colorado area that competes in the MLS Next Pro league, the third division of American soccer. The team is owned by, and operates as the reserve team of, the Major League Soccer club Colorado Rapids. The team was announced as a member of MLS Next Pro on December 6, 2021.

History 
On December 6, 2021, Colorado Rapids was named as one of 21 clubs that would field a team in the new MLS Next Pro league beginning in the 2022 season. Rapids announced that the team would be titled Colorado Rapids 2, and that Brian Crookham would serve as general manager.

On February 10, 2022, Rapids announced Erik Bushey as head coach and former Trinidad and Tobago international player Brian Haynes as assistant coach.

Players and staff

Roster

Staff 
 Brian Crookham – general manager
 Erik Bushey – head coach
 Brian Haynes – assistant coach

Team records

Season-by-season

Head coaches record 

 Includes Regular season & Playoffs

See also 
 Colorado Rapids U-23
 MLS Next Pro

References

External links 
 

Association football clubs established in 2021
2021 establishments in Colorado
Colorado Rapids
Soccer clubs in Colorado
Reserve soccer teams in the United States
MLS Next Pro teams